Agnes Bell Collier (31 January 1860 – 2 January 1930) was a British mathematician who was a pioneer female mathematician, associated with Newnham College, Cambridge.

Born in Hyde, Cheshire, she was the eighth child of Joseph Smith Collier (1818–1869) and his wife Agnes (née Bell; 1824–1898). Her brother was Joseph Donald Collier FRCS. She was educated at Ellerslie Ladies' College, Manchester and Newnham College, Cambridge from 1880 to 1883, passing the Mathematical Tripos in 1883. She was College Lecturer in Mathematics from 1883 to 1925 and Director of Studies 1883–1920. She was College Vice-Principal 1920–25, and a College Associate from 1893 to 1917.

References 

1860 births
1930 deaths
Fellows of Newnham College, Cambridge
People from Hyde, Greater Manchester
British women mathematicians
British mathematicians